John Hugh Hare, 1st Viscount Blakenham, OBE, PC, DL (22 January 1911 – 7 March 1982) was a British Conservative politician.

Background and education
Blakenham was the third son of The Rt. Hon. Richard Hare, 4th Earl of Listowel, an Anglo-Irish aristocrat, and The Hon. Freda Vanden-Bampde-Johnstone. His elder brother, The 5th Earl of Listowel, was a prominent Labour politician. He was educated at Eton.

Political career
Blakenham was an Alderman of London County Council between 1937 and 1952 and fought in the Second World War with the Suffolk Yeomanry in Italy and was awarded the Legion of Honour and appointed an OBE. He sat as Member of Parliament for Woodbridge between 1945 and 1950 and for Sudbury and Woodbridge between 1950 and 1963 and was vice-chairman of the Conservative Party between 1952 and 1955. He served under Sir Anthony Eden as Minister of State for the Colonies between 1955 and 1956 and under Eden and his successor, Harold Macmillan, as Secretary of State for War from 1956 to 1958.

He later held office under Macmillan as Minister of Agriculture, Fisheries and Food from 1958 to 1960 and Minister of Labour between 1960 and 1963. He was admitted to the Privy Council in 1955 and in 1963 he was elevated to the peerage as Viscount Blakenham, of Little Blakenham in the County of Suffolk. Blakenham then served under Sir Alec Douglas-Home as Chancellor of the Duchy of Lancaster and Deputy Leader of the House of Lords from 1963 to 1964 and was chairman of the Conservative Party between 1963 and 1965.

Family
Lord Blakenham married the Hon. Nancy Pearson, daughter of Weetman Pearson, 2nd Viscount Cowdray, on 31 January 1934. They had three children:

Hon. Mary Anne Hare (b. 9 April 1936)
Michael John Hare, 2nd Viscount Blakenham (25 January 1938 - 8 January 2018)
Hon. Joanna Freda Hare (b. 27 July 1942)

In 1967, Joanna married American attorney and Harvard Law School professor Stephen Breyer; Breyer would be appointed a Circuit Judge on the United States Court of Appeals for the First Circuit in 1980 and a Justice of the Supreme Court of the United States in 1994.

Lord Blakenham died in March 1982, aged 71, and was succeeded in the viscountcy by his only son, Michael. Lady Blakenham died in November 1994, aged 86.

Horticultural interests
In 1951 he purchased a wood close to his home, to make a woodland garden. Over the following years he created glades and paths through the bluebells and planted many rare plants, and became known as the Blakenham Woodland Garden.

Hare received the Victoria Medal of Honour from the Royal Horticultural Society in 1974. In 1982 he became treasurer of the Society.

The Blakenham Woodland Garden was inherited by his son and is open to the public. On his death the wood was made into a charitable trust. His son, Michael Blakenham, a lifelong environmentalist has increased the stock of unusual specimens and has bought many rare including unnamed trees and shrubs from auctions at Royal Botanic Gardens, Kew.

References

External links 
 

1911 births
1982 deaths
British Secretaries of State
Secretaries of State for War (UK)
Chancellors of the Duchy of Lancaster
Conservative Party (UK) MPs for English constituencies
UK MPs 1945–1950
UK MPs 1950–1951
UK MPs 1951–1955
UK MPs 1955–1959
UK MPs 1959–1964
UK MPs who were granted peerages
People educated at Eton College
British Army personnel of World War II
Recipients of the Legion of Honour
Agriculture ministers of the United Kingdom
Members of London County Council
Conservative Party (UK) hereditary peers
Members of the Privy Council of the United Kingdom
Officers of the Order of the British Empire
Younger sons of earls
Suffolk Yeomanry officers
Chairmen of the Conservative Party (UK)
People from Mid Suffolk District
Ministers in the Eden government, 1955–1957
Ministers in the Macmillan and Douglas-Home governments, 1957–1964
Viscounts created by Elizabeth II
John